Pudhari is a popular Marathi daily, printed in three centres and distributed in Maharashtra, Goa and North Karnataka. It is the leader in Kolhapur and Western Maharashtra and the third-largest Marathi newspaper daily in the entire state of Maharashtra. Alongside Satyawadi, it is one of the two oldest surviving newspapers in the state.

History
Pudhari was founded as a weekly in 1937 and turned daily in 1939. In 1943, Ganpatrao Jadhav became its new owner. Pratapsinh Jadhav followed in his footsteps.

Journalist Palagummi Sainath has accused Pudhari of publishing paid news in 2009 on the Maharashtra Chief Minister, Ashok Chavan. In 2016, Pudhari'''s publisher, Pudhari Publications, invested in new colour printing and design technologies. In 2018, the editorial office of Pudhari'' was attacked with stones by Pune protesters.

References

Daily newspapers published in India
Marathi-language newspapers
Newspapers published in Mumbai
Newspapers established in 1937
1937 establishments in India